The 1986 Pittsburgh Pirates season was the 105th season of the Pittsburgh Pirates franchise; and their 100th in the National League. This was their 17th season at Three Rivers Stadium. The Pirates finished sixth and last in the National League East with a record of 64–98. This was also the rookie season of left fielder Barry Bonds, who led the Pirates with 36 stolen bases and finished second on the club with 16 home runs.

Regular season

Season standings

Game log

|- bgcolor="ffbbbb"
| 1 || April 8 || Mets || 2–4 || Gooden || Reuschel (0–1) || — || 48,962 || 0–1
|- bgcolor="ffbbbb"
| 2 || April 11 || Cubs || 4–5 || Trout || McWilliams (0–1) || Smith || 2,490 || 0–2
|- bgcolor="ccffcc"
| 3 || April 12 || Cubs || 3–1 || Rhoden (1–0) || Smith || Guante (1) || 5,623 || 1–2
|- bgcolor="ccffcc"
| 4 || April 13 || Cubs || 8–0 || Reuschel (1–1) || Sutcliffe || — || 9,337 || 2–2
|- bgcolor="ccffcc"
| 5 || April 14 || @ Phillies || 3–1 (10) || Guante (1–0) || Bedrosian || Winn (1) || 16,200 || 3–2
|- bgcolor="ccffcc"
| 6 || April 18 || @ Cubs || 4–0 || Rhoden (2–0) || Sutcliffe || — || 38,151 || 4–2
|- bgcolor="ccffcc"
| 7 || April 19 || @ Cubs || 14–8 || Reuschel (2–1) || Sanderson || — || 26,932 || 5–2
|- bgcolor="ccffcc"
| 8 || April 20 || @ Cubs || 10–8 (17) || Jones (1–0) || DiPino || — || 18,508 || 6–2
|- bgcolor="ffbbbb"
| 9 || April 21 || @ Mets || 5–6 || McDowell || Clements (0–1) || — || 10,282 || 6–3
|- bgcolor="ffbbbb"
| 10 || April 22 || @ Mets || 1–7 || Ojeda || Kipper (0–1) || — || 15,668 || 6–4
|- bgcolor="ffbbbb"
| 11 || April 24 || Phillies || 2–4 || Rawley || Rhoden (2–1) || — || 14,622 || 6–5
|- bgcolor="ffbbbb"
| 12 || April 25 || Phillies || 3–6 || Gross || Reuschel (2–2) || Bedrosian || 11,847 || 6–6
|- bgcolor="ffbbbb"
| 13 || April 26 || Phillies || 5–6 || Hudson || McWilliams (0–2) || Bedrosian || 16,373 || 6–7
|- bgcolor="ccffcc"
| 14 || April 27 || Phillies || 13–5 || Bielecki (1–0) || Carlton || Walk (1) || 17,218 || 7–7
|- bgcolor="ffbbbb"
| 15 || April 28 || @ Dodgers || 1–2 || Valenzuela || Kipper (0–2) || — || 50,401 || 7–8
|- bgcolor="ffbbbb"
| 16 || April 29 || @ Dodgers || 4–5 || Hershiser || Patterson (0–1) || Howell || 30,342 || 7–9
|- bgcolor="ffbbbb"
| 17 || April 30 || @ Giants || 5–6 (12) || Garrelts || Patterson (0–2) || — || 5,147 || 7–10
|-

|- bgcolor="ccffcc"
| 18 || May 1 || @ Giants || 6–2 || Walk (1–0) || Krukow || — || 3,927 || 8–10
|- bgcolor="ccffcc"
| 19 || May 2 || @ Padres || 4–0 || Bielecki (2–0) || Dravecky || Winn (2) || 19,417 || 9–10
|- bgcolor="ccffcc"
| 20 || May 3 || @ Padres || 7–6 || Guante (2–0) || Gossage || Clements (1) || 20,515 || 10–10
|- bgcolor="ccffcc"
| 21 || May 4 || @ Padres || 5–2 || Winn (1–0) || Lefferts || — || 21,727 || 11–10
|- bgcolor="ffbbbb"
| 22 || May 6 || Giants || 2–7 || Krukow || Reuschel (2–3) || — || 7,461 || 11–11
|- bgcolor="ffbbbb"
| 23 || May 7 || Giants || 5–7 || Laskey || McWilliams (0–3) || Robinson || 6,300 || 11–12
|- bgcolor="ccffcc"
| 24 || May 8 || Giants || 8–2 || Bielecki (3–0) || Garrelts || — || 6,072 || 12–12
|- bgcolor="ffbbbb"
| 25 || May 9 || Astros || 2–3 || Kerfeld || Winn (1–1) || Smith || 17,296 || 12–13
|- bgcolor="ffbbbb"
| 26 || May 10 || Astros || 3–6 || Knepper || Rhoden (2–2) || DiPino || 13,344 || 12–14
|- bgcolor="ccffcc"
| 27 || May 11 || Astros || 4–3 (12) || DeLeon (1–0) || Kerfeld || — || 13,170 || 13–14
|- bgcolor="ffbbbb"
| 28 || May 13 || Padres || 2–4 || Show || Bielecki (3–1) || McCullers || 5,392 || 13–15
|- bgcolor="ffbbbb"
| 29 || May 14 || Padres || 4–10 || Dravecky || Kipper (0–3) || Gossage || 9,430 || 13–16
|- bgcolor="ffbbbb"
| 30 || May 16 || @ Reds || 2–7 || Denny || Rhoden (2–3) || Franco || 21,097 || 13–17
|- bgcolor="ccffcc"
| 31 || May 17 || @ Reds || 4–0 || Reuschel (3–3) || Soto || — || 32,204 || 14–17
|- bgcolor="ffbbbb"
| 32 || May 18 || @ Reds || 3–7 || Browning || Bielecki (3–2) || Robinson || 22,962 || 14–18
|- bgcolor="ccffcc"
| 33 || May 20 || @ Astros || 4–2 || Walk (2–0) || Ryan || — || 8,711 || 15–18
|- bgcolor="ccffcc"
| 34 || May 21 || @ Astros || 2–1 || Rhoden (3–3) || Scott || — || 6,990 || 16–18
|- bgcolor="ffbbbb"
| 35 || May 22 || @ Astros || 0–4 || Knepper || Reuschel (3–4) || — || 4,784 || 16–19
|- bgcolor="ffbbbb"
| 36 || May 23 || Reds || 9–12 (12) || Power || DeLeon (1–1) || — || 12,833 || 16–20
|- bgcolor="ffbbbb"
| 37 || May 24 || Reds || 2–4 || Gullickson || Bielecki (3–3) || — || 18,631 || 16–21
|- bgcolor="ffbbbb"
| 38 || May 25 || Reds || 4–7 || Denny || Kipper (0–4) || — || 19,568 || 16–22
|- bgcolor="ffbbbb"
| 39 || May 26 || Braves || 4–9 || Assenmacher || Walk (2–1) || — || 14,102 || 16–23
|- bgcolor="ffbbbb"
| 40 || May 27 || Braves || 2–6 (12) || Garber || Walk (2–2) || — || 2,830 || 16–24
|- bgcolor="ccffcc"
| 41 || May 28 || Braves || 4–3 || McWilliams (1–3) || Palmer || DeLeon (1) || 6,860 || 17–24
|- bgcolor="ffbbbb"
| 42 || May 30 || Dodgers || 4–6 (11) || Niedenfuer || DeLeon (1–2) || Reuss || 25,320 || 17–25
|- bgcolor="ccffcc"
| 43 || May 31 || Dodgers || 4–0 || Kipper (1–4) || Honeycutt || Clements (2) || 15,709 || 18–25
|-

|- bgcolor="ccffcc"
| 44 || June 1 || Dodgers || 12–3 || Rhoden (4–3) || Welch || — || 23,530 || 19–25
|- bgcolor="ccffcc"
| 45 || June 2 || @ Braves || 9–2 || Reuschel (4–4) || Palmer || — || 12,996 || 20–25
|- bgcolor="ffbbbb"
| 46 || June 3 || @ Braves || 5–8 || Mahler || Guante (2–1) || Assenmacher || 10,649 || 20–26
|- bgcolor="ccffcc"
| 47 || June 4 || @ Braves || 12–3 || Bielecki (4–3) || Johnson || Winn (3) || 14,012 || 21–26
|- bgcolor="ffbbbb"
| 48 || June 5 || Mets || 0–7 || Ojeda || Kipper (1–5) || — || 8,855 || 21–27
|- bgcolor="ccffcc"
| 49 || June 6 || Mets || 7–1 || Rhoden (5–3) || Darling || Walk (2) ||  || 22–27
|- bgcolor="ffbbbb"
| 50 || June 6 || Mets || 4–10 || McDowell || DeLeon (1–3) || — || 15,113 || 22–28
|- bgcolor="ffbbbb"
| 51 || June 7 || Mets || 4–6 || Gooden || Reuschel (4–5) || Orosco || 29,770 || 22–29
|- bgcolor="ffbbbb"
| 52 || June 8 || Mets || 3–4 || Fernandez || McWilliams (1–4) || Orosco || 14,391 || 22–30
|- bgcolor="ccffcc"
| 53 || June 9 || Cubs || 6–5 (11) || Robinson (1–0) || Baller || — || 6,056 || 23–30
|- bgcolor="ccffcc"
| 54 || June 10 || Cubs || 6–4 || Kipper (2–5) || Eckersley || Guante (2) || 5,899 || 24–30
|- bgcolor="ccffcc"
| 55 || June 11 || Cubs || 5–3 || Rhoden (6–3) || Hoffman || Robinson (3) || 12,702 || 25–30
|- bgcolor="ffbbbb"
| 56 || June 13 || @ Mets || 5–6 || Orosco || Clements (0–2) || — || 37,582 || 25–31
|- bgcolor="ffbbbb"
| 57 || June 14 || @ Mets || 1–5 || Fernandez || Bielecki (4–4) || — || 47,664 || 25–32
|- bgcolor="ffbbbb"
| 58 || June 15 || @ Mets || 1–4 || Ojeda || Walk (2–3) || — ||  || 25–33
|- bgcolor="ffbbbb"
| 59 || June 15 || @ Mets || 5–8 || Aguilera || Kipper (2–6) || McDowell || 41,847 || 25–34
|- bgcolor="ffbbbb"
| 60 || June 16 || Cardinals || 2–4 || Cox || Rhoden (6–4) || Worrell || 7,834 || 25–35
|- bgcolor="ffbbbb"
| 61 || June 17 || Cardinals || 2–7 || Mathews || Reuschel (4–6) || — || 9,424 || 25–36
|- bgcolor="ccffcc"
| 62 || June 18 || Cardinals || 2–1 (12) || Robinson (2–0) || Worrell || — || 10,455 || 26–36
|- bgcolor="ccffcc"
| 63 || June 19 || @ Expos || 4–2 || Kipper (3–6) || Smith || Guante (3) || 11,918 || 27–36
|- bgcolor="ffbbbb"
| 64 || June 20 || @ Expos || 2–7 || McGaffigan || Walk (2–4) || McClure || 16,223 || 27–37
|- bgcolor="ccffcc"
| 65 || June 21 || @ Expos || 14–1 || Rhoden (7–4) || Tibbs || — || 23,381 || 28–37
|- bgcolor="ffbbbb"
| 66 || June 22 || @ Expos || 1–2 || Hesketh || Reuschel (4–7) || Reardon || 27,129 || 28–38
|- bgcolor="ffbbbb"
| 67 || June 23 || @ Cardinals || 1–2 (11) || Worrell || Clements (0–3) || — || 25,506 || 28–39
|- bgcolor="ffbbbb"
| 68 || June 24 || @ Cardinals || 2–5 || Burris || Winn (1–2) || Dayley || 24,251 || 28–40
|- bgcolor="ffbbbb"
| 69 || June 25 || @ Cardinals || 1–2 (10) || Horton || Clements (0–4) || — || 29,146 || 28–41
|- bgcolor="ccffcc"
| 70 || June 27 || Expos || 7–1 || Rhoden (8–4) || Tibbs || — || 15,392 || 29–41
|- bgcolor="ffbbbb"
| 71 || June 28 || Expos || 2–3 || Hesketh || Reuschel (4–8) || Reardon || 35,385 || 29–42
|- bgcolor="ffbbbb"
| 72 || June 29 || Expos || 4–6 || Youmans || Bielecki (4–5) || McClure || 26,689 || 29–43
|- bgcolor="ccffcc"
| 73 || June 30 || Phillies || 3–2 || Walk (3–4) || Hudson || Guante (4) || 5,881 || 30–43
|-

|- bgcolor="ffbbbb"
| 74 || July 1 || Phillies || 4–5 (12) || Hume || McWilliams (1–5) || — || 8,118 || 30–44
|- bgcolor="ccffcc"
| 75 || July 2 || Phillies || 4–3 || Rhoden (9–4) || Carman || — || 6,782 || 31–44
|- bgcolor="ffbbbb"
| 76 || July 3 || @ Dodgers || 3–6 || Welch || Reuschel (4–9) || — || 30,722 || 31–45
|- bgcolor="ccffcc"
| 77 || July 4 || @ Dodgers || 6–4 || Bielecki (5–5) || Valenzuela || — || 46,315 || 32–45
|- bgcolor="ccffcc"
| 78 || July 5 || @ Dodgers || 5–0 || Walk (4–4) || Hershiser || — || 32,694 || 33–45
|- bgcolor="ffbbbb"
| 79 || July 6 || @ Dodgers || 3–4 || Honeycutt || Winn (1–3) || Howell || 27,563 || 33–46
|- bgcolor="ccffcc"
| 80 || July 7 || @ Padres || 3–1 (10) || Guante (3–1) || Gossage || — || 28,366 || 34–46
|- bgcolor="ffbbbb"
| 81 || July 8 || @ Padres || 2–4 || Hoyt || Reuschel (4–10) || Lefferts || 16,051 || 34–47
|- bgcolor="ccffcc"
| 82 || July 9 || @ Padres || 6–4 || Bielecki (6–5) || McCullers || Robinson (4) || 15,816 || 35–47
|- bgcolor="ffbbbb"
| 83 || July 10 || @ Giants || 3–6 || Blue || Walk (4–5) || Garrelts || 9,795 || 35–48
|- bgcolor="ccffcc"
| 84 || July 11 || @ Giants || 8–4 || Winn (2–3) || Carlton || Robinson (5) || 18,703 || 36–48
|- bgcolor="ffbbbb"
| 85 || July 12 || @ Giants || 1–3 || Krukow || Rhoden (9–5) || — || 19,549 || 36–49
|- bgcolor="ffbbbb"
| 86 || July 13 || @ Giants || 4–11 || LaCoss || Reuschel (4–11) || — || 36,877 || 36–50
|- bgcolor="ffbbbb"
| 87 || July 17 || Padres || 1–2 || McCullers || Rhoden (9–6) || Lefferts || 8,865 || 36–51
|- bgcolor="ccffcc"
| 88 || July 18 || Padres || 12–7 || Reuschel (5–11) || Hawkins || — || 10,975 || 37–51
|- bgcolor="ccffcc"
| 89 || July 19 || Padres || 4–3 || Guante (4–1) || Lefferts || — || 8,559 || 38–51
|- bgcolor="ccffcc"
| 90 || July 20 || Padres || 4–2 || McWilliams (2–5) || Dravecky || Robinson (6) || 15,765 || 39–51
|- bgcolor="ffbbbb"
| 91 || July 22 || Dodgers || 3–4 || Powell || Guante (4–2) || Howell || 10,325 || 39–52
|- bgcolor="ffbbbb"
| 92 || July 23 || Dodgers || 5–6 || Hershiser || Reuschel (5–12) || Howell || 21,756 || 39–53
|- bgcolor="ffbbbb"
| 93 || July 24 || Dodgers || 2–9 || Valenzuela || Walk (4–6) || — || 11,044 || 39–54
|- bgcolor="ffbbbb"
| 94 || July 25 || Giants || 3–7 || Mason || Bielecki (6–6) || Robinson || 8,622 || 39–55
|- bgcolor="ffbbbb"
| 95 || July 26 || Giants || 0–9 || Carlton || McWilliams (2–6) || — || 27,910 || 39–56
|- bgcolor="ccffcc"
| 96 || July 27 || Giants || 7–0 || Rhoden (10–6) || Blue || Robinson (8) || 10,767 || 40–56
|- bgcolor="ccffcc"
| 97 || July 28 || @ Expos || 7–4 || Reuschel (6–12) || Smith || Jones (1) || 16,221 || 41–56
|- bgcolor="ffbbbb"
| 98 || July 30 || @ Expos || 2–3 || Tibbs || Winn (2–4) || Reardon || 12,672 || 41–57
|-

|- bgcolor="ccffcc"
| 99 || August 1 || Cardinals || 4–0 || Rhoden (11–6) || Mathews || — || 9,794 || 42–57
|- bgcolor="ffbbbb"
| 100 || August 2 || Cardinals || 3–7 || Tudor || McWilliams (2–7) || — || 14,233 || 42–58
|- bgcolor="ccffcc"
| 101 || August 3 || Cardinals || 3–0 || Reuschel (7–12) || Cox || — || 14,849 || 43–58
|- bgcolor="ffbbbb"
| 102 || August 4 || Expos || 4–5 || Tibbs || Jones (1–1) || Reardon || 7,412 || 43–59
|- bgcolor="ffbbbb"
| 103 || August 5 || Expos || 0–3 || Martinez || Bielecki (6–7) || — || 8,334 || 43–60
|- bgcolor="ffbbbb"
| 104 || August 6 || Expos || 2–3 || Youmans || Rhoden (11–7) || Reardon || 6,649 || 43–61
|- bgcolor="ffbbbb"
| 105 || August 7 || Expos || 4–5 || McGaffigan || Robinson (2–1) || McClure || 8,239 || 43–62
|- bgcolor="ffbbbb"
| 106 || August 8 || @ Cardinals || 1–3 || Cox || Reuschel (7–13) || Horton || 36,244 || 43–63
|- bgcolor="ccffcc"
| 107 || August 9 || @ Cardinals || 8–5 || Walk (5–6) || Burris || Robinson (9) || 40,723 || 44–63
|- bgcolor="ffbbbb"
| 108 || August 10 || @ Cardinals || 4–5 || Forsch || Bielecki (6–8) || Worrell || 36,286 || 44–64
|- bgcolor="ccffcc"
| 109 || August 11 || @ Cubs || 10–7 || Rhoden (12–7) || Moyer || Robinson (10) || 20,636 || 45–64
|- bgcolor="ffbbbb"
| 110 || August 12 || @ Cubs || 1–3 || Sanderson || McWilliams (2–8) || Smith || 23,874 || 45–65
|- bgcolor="ffbbbb"
| 111 || August 13 || @ Cubs || 8–9 || DiPino || Robinson (2–2) || Smith || 24,888 || 45–66
|- bgcolor="ffbbbb"
| 112 || August 14 || @ Phillies || 7–8 || Tekulve || Jones (1–2) || — || 20,643 || 45–67
|- bgcolor="ccffcc"
| 113 || August 15 || @ Phillies || 6–5 || Guante (5–2) || Schatzeder || Robinson (11) ||  || 46–67
|- bgcolor="ffbbbb"
| 114 || August 15 || @ Phillies || 2–3 || Maddux || Winn (2–5) || Bedrosian || 27,724 || 46–68
|- bgcolor="ccffcc"
| 115 || August 16 || @ Phillies || 6–1 || Rhoden (13–7) || Gross || — ||  || 47–68
|- bgcolor="ffbbbb"
| 116 || August 16 || @ Phillies || 0–6 || Hume || McWilliams (2–9) || Tekulve || 31,349 || 47–69
|- bgcolor="ffbbbb"
| 117 || August 17 || @ Phillies || 1–5 (5) || Ruffin || Reuschel (7–14) || — || 34,298 || 47–70
|- bgcolor="ffbbbb"
| 118 || August 18 || Astros || 0–3 || Scott || Walk (5–7) || — || 7,965 || 47–71
|- bgcolor="ffbbbb"
| 119 || August 19 || Astros || 0–1 || Deshaies || Bielecki (6–9) || Smith || 9,128 || 47–72
|- bgcolor="ccffcc"
| 120 || August 20 || Astros || 4–1 || Rhoden (14–7) || Knepper || — || 16,997 || 48–72
|- bgcolor="ccffcc"
| 121 || August 22 || Braves || 16–5 || Winn (3–5) || Mahler || Jones (2) || 27,517 || 49–72
|- bgcolor="ccffcc"
| 122 || August 23 || Braves || 4–3 || Reuschel (8–14) || Smith || Robinson (12) || 15,535 || 50–72
|- bgcolor="ccffcc"
| 123 || August 24 || Braves || 4–3 || Walk (6–7) || Alexander || Robinson (13) || 15,681 || 51–72
|- bgcolor="ffbbbb"
| 124 || August 25 || Reds || 4–5 || Robinson || McWilliams (2–10) || Franco || 8,093 || 51–73
|- bgcolor="ffbbbb"
| 125 || August 26 || Reds || 4–5 || Franco || Krawczyk (0–1) || — || 7,022 || 51–74
|- bgcolor="ffbbbb"
| 126 || August 27 || Reds || 5–9 || Murphy || Robinson (3–3) || — || 7,490 || 51–75
|- bgcolor="ffbbbb"
| 127 || August 29 || @ Astros || 2–3 || Scott || Reuschel (8–15) || Smith || 22,801 || 51–76
|- bgcolor="ccffcc"
| 128 || August 30 || @ Astros || 13–3 || Rhoden (15–7) || Deshaies || — || 30,598 || 52–76
|- bgcolor="ccffcc"
| 129 || August 31 || @ Astros || 8–2 || Walk (7–7) || Knepper || — || 25,405 || 53–76
|-

|- bgcolor="ffbbbb"
| 130 || September 1 || @ Reds || 5–6 || Power || Bielecki (6–10) || Franco || 22,064 || 53–77
|- bgcolor="ffbbbb"
| 131 || September 2 || @ Reds || 1–9 || Gullickson || Kipper (3–7) || — || 13,491 || 53–78
|- bgcolor="ccffcc"
| 132 || September 3 || @ Reds || 5–3 (10) || Jones (2–2) || Franco || — || 12,200 || 54–78
|- bgcolor="ffbbbb"
| 133 || September 5 || @ Braves || 3–4 || Assenmacher || Rhoden (15–8) || — || 6,992 || 54–79
|- bgcolor="ffbbbb"
| 134 || September 6 || @ Braves || 2–4 || Palmer || Fansler (0–1) || Dedmon || 8,875 || 54–80
|- bgcolor="ccffcc"
| 135 || September 7 || @ Braves || 3–1 || Kipper (4–7) || Speck || Jones (3) || 6,021 || 55–80
|- bgcolor="ccffcc"
| 136 || September 8 || Cardinals || 3–2 || Patterson (1–2) || Cox || Pena (1) || 4,990 || 56–80
|- bgcolor="ffbbbb"
| 137 || September 9 || Cardinals || 1–3 || Horton || Reuschel (8–16) || Worrell || 4,291 || 56–81
|- bgcolor="ffbbbb"
| 138 || September 10 || Cardinals || 3–4 || Soff || Jones (2–3) || Worrell || 7,479 || 56–82
|- bgcolor="ffbbbb"
| 139 || September 12 || Cubs || 8–9 (10) || DiPino || Robinson (3–4) || Gumpert || 15,664 || 56–83
|- bgcolor="ccffcc"
| 140 || September 13 || Cubs || 5–2 || Patterson (2–2) || Maddux || Robinson (14) || 10,841 || 57–83
|- bgcolor="ccffcc"
| 141 || September 14 || Cubs || 9–2 || Reuschel (9–16) || Hall || — || 16,256 || 58–83
|- bgcolor="ffbbbb"
| 142 || September 15 || @ Phillies || 0–5 || Carman || Rhoden (15–9) || — || 14,089 || 58–84
|- bgcolor="ffbbbb"
| 143 || September 16 || @ Phillies || 5–9 || Tekulve || Bielecki (6–11) || — || 14,315 || 58–85
|- bgcolor="ffbbbb"
| 144 || September 17 || @ Expos || 5–6 || St. Claire || Jones (2–4) || Reardon ||  || 58–86
|- bgcolor="ccffcc"
| 145 || September 17 || @ Expos || 4–1 || Kipper (5–7) || Sebra || Robinson (15) || 5,774 || 59–86
|- bgcolor="ccffcc"
| 146 || September 18 || @ Expos || 3–1 || Smiley (1–0) || Reardon || Robinson (16) || 4,012 || 60–86
|- bgcolor="ffbbbb"
| 147 || September 19 || @ Cubs || 2–8 || Sanderson || Pena (0–1) || — || 5,152 || 60–87
|- bgcolor="ffbbbb"
| 148 || September 20 || @ Cubs || 0–1 || Moyer || Rhoden (15–10) || Smith || 22,710 || 60–88
|- bgcolor="ffbbbb"
| 149 || September 21 || @ Cubs || 2–3 || Sanderson || Pena (0–2) || Smith || 22,336 || 60–89
|- bgcolor="ffbbbb"
| 150 || September 22 || Phillies || 4–8 || Bittiger || Kipper (5–8) || — || 3,934 || 60–90
|- bgcolor="ccffcc"
| 151 || September 23 || Phillies || 6–5 || Jones (3–4) || Bedrosian || — || 3,631 || 61–90
|- bgcolor="ccffcc"
| 152 || September 24 || Expos || 2–1 || Robinson (4–4) || McClure || — || 3,092 || 62–90
|- bgcolor="ffbbbb"
| 153 || September 25 || Expos || 4–8 || Owchinko || Rhoden (15–11) || — || 3,963 || 62–91
|- bgcolor="ffbbbb"
| 154 || September 26 || Mets || 1–3 || Fernandez || Fansler (0–2) || McDowell || 14,080 || 62–92
|- bgcolor="ffbbbb"
| 155 || September 27 || Mets || 2–4 (11) || Orosco || McWilliams (2–11) || Sisk || 13,210 || 62–93
|- bgcolor="ffbbbb"
| 156 || September 28 || Mets || 1–4 (11) || Aguilera || Walk (7–8) || — || 30,606 || 62–94
|- bgcolor="ffbbbb"
| 157 || September 30 || @ Cardinals || 3–5 || Cox || Rhoden (15–12) || — || 12,338 || 62–95
|-

|- bgcolor="ccffcc"
| 158 || October 1 || @ Cardinals || 4–3 || McWilliams (3–11) || Soff || Robinson (17) || 16,039 || 63–95
|- bgcolor="ccffcc"
| 159 || October 2 || @ Cardinals || 5–1 || Kipper (6–8) || Conroy || — || 20,643 || 64–95
|- bgcolor="ffbbbb"
| 160 || October 4 || @ Mets || 1–6 || Ojeda || Fansler (0–3) || Orosco ||  || 64–96
|- bgcolor="ffbbbb"
| 161 || October 4 || @ Mets || 2–5 || Aguilera || Patterson (2–3) || McDowell || 30,810 || 64–97
|- bgcolor="ffbbbb"
| 162 || October 5 || @ Mets || 0–9 || Darling || Pena (0–3) || Fernandez || 32,170 || 64–98
|-

|-
| Legend:       = Win       = LossBold = Pirates team member

Record vs. opponents

Detailed records

Roster

Opening Day lineup

Player stats
Batting
Note: G = Games played; AB = At bats; H = Hits; Avg. = Batting average; HR = Home runs; RBI = Runs batted in

Pitching
Note: G = Games pitched; IP = Innings pitched; W = Wins; L = Losses; ERA = Earned run average; SO = Strikeouts

Awards and honors

 Barry Bonds, Led all rookies in home runs (16)

1986 Major League Baseball All-Star Game
Tony Peña, C, reserve
Rick Rhoden, P, reserve

Transactions
 December 10, 1985 – Bobby Bonilla drafted by the Chicago White Sox in the 1985 rule 5 draft.
 December 10, 1985 – Bip Roberts drafted by the San Diego Padres in the 1985 rule 5 draft.
 December 15, 1985 – Purchased Matias Carrillo from Poza Rica (Mexican).
 January 14, 1986 – Drafted Moisés Alou in the 1st round (2nd pick) of the 1986 amateur draft (January). Player signed May 23, 1986.
 January 14, 1986 – Drafted Archi Cianfrocco in the 11th round of the 1986 amateur draft (January), but did not sign the player.
 February 13, 1986 – Signed Ed Farmer as a free agent.
 April 1, 1986 – Traded Chris Green to the California Angels. Received Kevin Davis (minors).
 April 3, 1986 – Traded Marvell Wynne to the San Diego Padres. Received Bob Patterson.
 April 4, 1986 – Released Johnnie LeMaster.
 April 4, 1986 – Released Sixto Lezcano.
 April 4, 1986 – Traded Jason Thompson to the Montreal Expos. Received players to be named later. The Montreal Expos sent Ben Abner (minors) (April 7, 1986) and Ronnie Giddens (minors) (April 7, 1986) to the Pittsburgh Pirates to complete the trade.
 April 24, 1986 – Signed U.L. Washington as a free agent.
 May 1, 1986 – Released Ravelo Manzanillo.
 May 8, 1986 – Released Steve Kemp.
 June 2, 1986 – Drafted Jeff King in the 1st round (1st pick) of the 1986 amateur draft. Player signed July 10, 1986.
 June 2, 1986 – Drafted Mike Walker in the 2nd round of the 1986 amateur draft.
 June 2, 1986 – Drafted Scott Ruskin in the 3rd round of the 1986 amateur draft (June Secondary).
 June 2, 1986 – Drafted Archi Cianfrocco in the 4th round of the 1986 amateur draft (June Secondary), but did not sign the player.
 June 2, 1986 – Drafted Tom Goodwin in the 6th round of the 1986 amateur draft, but did not sign the player.
 June 2, 1986 – Drafted Tony Longmire in the 8th round of the 1986 amateur draft.
 June 2, 1986 – Drafted Stan Belinda in the 10th round of the 1986 amateur draft. Player signed June 5, 1986.
 June 2, 1986 – Drafted Keith Shepherd in the 11th round of the 1986 amateur draft. Player signed June 28, 1986.
 June 2, 1986 – Drafted Tommy Shields in the 15th round of the 1986 amateur draft.
 June 2, 1986 – Drafted Jeff Banister in the 25th round of the 1986 amateur draft.
 June 2, 1986 – Drafted Rick Reed in the 26th round of the 1986 amateur draft. Player signed July 2, 1986.
 June 2, 1986 – Drafted Mike Mordecai in the 33rd round of the 1986 amateur draft, but did not sign the player.
 July 13, 1986 – Signed Willie Smith as an amateur free agent.
 July 23, 1986 – Released Lee Mazzilli.
 July 23, 1986 – Traded José DeLeón to the Chicago White Sox. Received Bobby Bonilla.
 July 30, 1986 – Signed Julio Peguero as an amateur free agent.
 September 30, 1986 – Traded Jeff Zaske to the Texas Rangers. Received Randy Kramer.
 October 11, 1986 – Signed Mike York as a free agent.
 October 15, 1986 – Trench Davis granted free agency.

Farm system

References

 1986 Pittsburgh Pirates team page at Baseball Reference
 1986 Pittsburgh Pirates team page at www.baseball-almanac.com

Pittsburgh Pirates seasons
Pittsburgh Pirates season
Pitts